is a deceased Japanese professional shogi player who achieved the rank of 8-dan (the highest dan at the time) and also 9-dan, which was an honorary rank, after death.

Kanda's son, Shizuo Kanda (神田鎮雄), also became a professional player.

Early life

Shogi professional

Kanda was involved in a controversy over his promotion to the rank of 8-dan, which led to a western faction of shogi players (the Japan Shogi Reform Society 日本将棋革新協会 nihon shōgi kakushin kyōkai) splitting away from the newly formed Japan Shogi Association.

Promotion history

Titles and other championships

Kanda was one of the 8 competitors in the very first tournament league for the first Meijin title in 1937, when the title shifted from a hereditary system to a tournament competition. Yoshio Kimura was the winner and became the first Meijin.

In 1942, Kanda was the challenger for the third Meijin title tournament against Yoshio Kimura. However, he lost all four games, and Kimura retained the title.

References

Japanese shogi players
Deceased professional shogi players
Professional shogi players from Hyōgo Prefecture
People from Kobe
1893 births
1943 deaths